This is a list of the players who were on the rosters of the given teams who participated in the 2008 Beijing Olympics for men's water polo. The men's tournament included twelve teams, with a maximum of thirteen players per team.

Pool A

The following is the Australian roster in the men's water polo tournament of the 2008 Summer Olympics.

Head coach: John Fox

The following is the Canadian roster in the men's water polo tournament of the 2008 Summer Olympics.

Head coach: Dragan Jovanović

The following is the Greek roster in the men's water polo tournament of the 2008 Summer Olympics.

Head coach: Alessandro Campagna

The following is the Hungarian roster in the men's water polo tournament of the 2008 Summer Olympics.

Head coach: Dénes Kemény

The following is the Montenegrin roster in the men's water polo tournament of the 2008 Summer Olympics.

Head coach: Petar Porobić

The following is the Spanish roster in the men's water polo tournament of the 2008 Summer Olympics.

Head coach: Rafael Aguilar

Group B

The following is the Chinese roster in the men's water polo tournament of the 2008 Summer Olympics.

Head coach: Wang Minhui

The following is the Croatian roster in the men's water polo tournament of the 2008 Summer Olympics.

Head coach: Ratko Rudić

The following is the German roster in the men's water polo tournament of the 2008 Summer Olympics.

Head coach: Hagen Stamm

The following is the Italian roster in the men's water polo tournament of the 2008 Summer Olympics.

Head coach: Paolo Malara

The following is the Serbian roster in the men's water polo tournament of the 2008 Summer Olympics.

Head coach: Dejan Udovičić

The following is the American roster in the men's water polo tournament of the 2008 Summer Olympics.

Head coach: Terry Schroeder

See also
Water polo at the 2008 Summer Olympics – Women's team rosters

References

Men's team rosters
2008 Summer Olympics